Govar or Gavar may refer to:
 Gavar, Kaleybar, East Azerbaijan Province
 Gavar, Tabriz, East Azerbaijan Province
 Gavar, Kerman
 Gavar, Markazi
 Govar District, in Kermanshah Province